The New King James Version (NKJV) is a translation of the Bible in contemporary English. Published by Thomas Nelson, the complete NKJV was released in 1982. With regard to its textual basis, the NKJV relies on a recently published critical edition (the Biblia Hebraica Stuttgartensia) for the Old Testament, while opting to use the Textus Receptus for the New Testament. 

The NKJV is described by Thomas Nelson as being "scrupulously faithful to the original, yet truly updated to enhance its clarity and readability."

History 
The NKJV translation project was conceived by Arthur Farstad. It was inaugurated in 1975 with two meetings (Nashville and Chicago) of 130 biblical scholars, pastors, and theologians. The men who were invited prepared the guidelines for the NKJV.

The aim of its translators was to update the vocabulary and grammar of the King James Version, while preserving the classic style and literary beauty of the original 1769 edition of the King James Version. The 130 translators believed in faithfulness to the original Greek, Aramaic, and Hebrew texts including the Dead Sea Scrolls. Also agreed upon for most New King James Bibles were easier event descriptions, a history of each book, and added dictionary and updated concordance.

The text for the New Testament was published in 1979; the Psalms in 1980; and the full Bible in 1982. The project took seven years in total to complete.

Features 
According to its preface, the NKJV uses the 1967/1977 Stuttgart edition of the Biblia Hebraica for the Old Testament, with frequent comparisons made to the Ben Hayyim edition of the Mikraot Gedolot published by Daniel Bomberg in 1524–25, which was used for the King James Version. Both the Old Testament text of the NKJV and that of the KJV come from the ben Chayyim text. However, the 1967/1977 Stuttgart edition of the Biblia Hebraica used by the NKJV uses an earlier manuscript (the Leningrad Manuscript B19a) than that of the KJV.

The New King James Version also uses the Textus Receptus ("Received Text") for the New Testament, just as the original King James Version had used.
As explained in the preface, notes in the center column acknowledge variations from Novum Testamentum Graece (designated NU after Nestle-Aland and United Bible Societies) and the Majority Text (designated M).

Translation philosophy 
The translators have sought to follow the principles of translation used in the original King James Version, which the NKJV revisers call "complete equivalence" in contrast to "dynamic equivalence" used by many contemporary translations. The task of updating the English of the KJV involved significant changes in word order, grammar, vocabulary, and spelling. One of the most significant features of the NKJV was its replacement of early modern second-person pronouns, such as "thou" and "thine"; and corresponding verb forms, such as "speakest"; with their twentieth-century equivalents.

The Executive Editor of the NKJV, Arthur L. Farstad, addressed textual concerns in a book explaining the NKJV translation philosophy. While defending the Majority Text (also called the Byzantine text-type), and claiming that the Textus Receptus is inferior to the Majority Text, he noted (p. 114) that the NKJV references significant discrepancies among text types in its marginal notes: "None of the three [textual] traditions on every page of the New Testament ... is labeled 'best' or 'most reliable.' The reader is permitted to make up his or her own mind about the correct reading."

Related publications 
The NKJV is the basis for the Orthodox Study Bible. The New Testament is largely the same, being based on the Textus Receptus (which the Eastern Orthodox consider most reliable). Although the Old Testament was translated from the Academy of St. Athanasius Septuagint (which the Orthodox consider an inspired text), it has been rendered in the NKJV fashion. In addition, the deuterocanonical books are included, which is the first time they have been modeled according to the New King James style, as the original NKJV, being a largely Protestant translation, did not include them.

Circulation 
The NKJV translation has become one of the best-selling Bibles in the USA.  it is listed as the sixth best selling Bible by the ECPA (Evangelical Christian Publishers Association).

An unabridged audiobook version called "The Word of Promise Audio Bible" has been produced by the publisher. It is narrated by celebrities and fully dramatized with music and sound effects.

Gideons International, an organization that places Bibles in hotels and hospitals, at one stage used the NKJV translation along with the KJV, offering the KJV as the default translation and offering the NKJV when an organization asked for a Bible in newer English to be used. After HarperCollins' acquisition of Thomas Nelson, however, the Gideons have chosen to start using the English Standard Version (ESV) instead of the NKJV.

See also 
 Modern English Bible translations

Notes

References

External links 
 Official webpage

1982 books
1982 in Christianity
Bible translations into English